Pradeep Rawat (born 21 January 1952) is an Indian actor who works predominantly in Telugu, Hindi, and Tamil language films. Notable for playing villainous roles, Rawat's first appearance was in B.R. Chopra's Mahabharat as Ashwatthama. He appeared in Yug as a British police officer Marshal. He also played various roles in serial Jai Mata Di He was in memorable roles in Bollywood films such as Sarfarosh as Sultan, in Lagaan as Deva, in Ghajini (2005) as Ram and Lakshman, and in its Hindi remake Ghajini (2008) as the title character.

Rawat was introduced into Telugu cinema with the film Sye. In Tamil cinema his memorable hit was Ghajini where he appeared in a double role. He debuted in Kannada cinema with Parodi; Malayalam cinema with China Town; Bengali cinema with Hero 420 and Bhojpuri cinema with Crack Fighter.

Awards

 2004: Winner, Filmfare Best Villain Award (Telugu) for Sye
 2004: Winner, Santosham Best Villain Award for Sye
 2004: Winner, Nandi Award for Best Villain for Sye
 2012: Nominated- SIIMA Award for Best Actor in a Negative Role (Telugu) for - Mangala
 2014:Nominated- SIIMA Award for Best Actor in a Negative Role (Telugu) for -Naayak

Filmography

Telugu

Hindi

Tamil

Kannada

Malayalam

English

Odia

Bengali

Bhojpuri

Television

References

External links
 

Living people
Indian male film actors
20th-century Indian male actors
21st-century Indian male actors
Male actors in Telugu cinema
Male actors in Hindi cinema
Male actors in Tamil cinema
Male actors in Kannada cinema
Male actors in Malayalam cinema
Male actors in Bengali cinema
Male actors in Bhojpuri cinema
Male actors in Odia cinema
Filmfare Awards South winners
Nandi Award winners
1952 births